Alexander David Williams (born March 12, 1999) is an American professional baseball shortstop in the Tampa Bay Rays organization.

Amateur career
Williams attended Rancho Bernardo High School in San Diego, California, where he played baseball. As a sophomore, he hit .402 with 22 RBIs. For his high school career, he had a .374 batting average. He was selected by the New York Yankees in the 32nd round of the 2017 Major League Baseball draft but did not sign and instead enrolled at Arizona State University to play college baseball.

In 2018, as a freshman at Arizona State, Williams appeared in 55 games (making 54 starts), batting .280 with twenty RBIs. As a sophomore in 2019, he hit .333 with four home runs, 53 RBIs, and nine stolen bases over 57 games. In 2018 and 2019, he played collegiate summer baseball in the Cape Cod Baseball League for the Bourne Braves. During the summer of 2019, he also played for the United States collegiate national baseball team. During his junior year in 2020, Williams batted .250 with one home run and eight RBIs over 17 games before the college baseball season was cut short due to the COVID-19 pandemic.

Professional career
Williams was selected 37th overall by the Tampa Bay Rays in the 2020 Major League Baseball draft. He signed with the Rays on June 18 for $1.85 million. He did not play a minor league game in 2020 due to the cancellation of the minor league season caused by the pandemic. 

Williams made his professional debut in 2021 with the Charleston RiverDogs of the Low-A East. He was promoted to the Bowling Green Hot Rods of the High-A East in mid-August. After 13 games with Bowling Green, he was promoted to the Durham Bulls of the Triple-A East, but was reassigned back to Bowling Green shortly after. Over 73 games between the three clubs, Williams slashed .267/.312/.375 with five home runs and 46 RBIs. He returned to Bowling Green to open the 2022 season.

References

External links

Arizona State Sun Devils bio

1999 births
Living people
Arizona State Sun Devils baseball players
Baseball players from San Diego
Baseball shortstops
Bourne Braves players
United States national baseball team players
Charleston RiverDogs players
Bowling Green Hot Rods players
Durham Bulls players